José Fábio Santos de Oliveira (born April 21, 1987 in Maceió), commonly known as Fábio or Fábio Santos, is a Brazilian striker. He currently plays for URT.

Career
Fábio Santos started his professional career in Japan with J2 League club Mito HollyHock, he made 13 appearances and scored 3 goals during his time in Mito before moving on to join fellow second tier side Shonan Bellmare. He scored another 3 goals in a total of 15 appearances for Shonan before returning to Brazil in 2006. He firstly joined Coruripe before signing for Gama, his next club was Villa Rio but despite remaining with the club for four seasons he appeared in just 14 matches for them as his spell was littered with loan spells. His first temporary transfer was to Botafogo in 2008, where he scored 7 times in 30 games.

He returned to Villa Rio in 2009 before immediately leaving on loan again, this time he made a return to Japan with Tokushima Vortis. 3 goals in 30 matches followed before departing for his homeland once again to join São Caetano, that was followed by a loan to Oeste in 2011. He returned to Villa Rio soon after before departing permanently as he agreed to sign for Avaí, however his move to Avaí which lasted from 2011 to 2012 was filled with two loan spells, first to Vitória and then to Red Bull Brasil.

In 2013, Fábio Santos returned to Asia as he completed a transfer to Daegu but made just two appearances before returning to former loan club Oeste on a short-term contract. He made 15 appearances over two seasons for Oeste in Série D before subsequently joining Ponte Preta, América, Central and most recently URT, for whom he made his debut with against Cruzeiro in the 2016 Campeonato Mineiro.

Club statistics

Honours
Coruripe
Campeonato Alagoano: 2006

Botafogo
Taça Rio: 2008

Oeste
Campeonato Paulista do Interior: 2011

References

External links
CBF 

zerozero.pt 

1987 births
Living people
Brazilian footballers
Brazilian expatriate footballers
Sport Club Corinthians Alagoano players
Mito HollyHock players
Shonan Bellmare players
Tokushima Vortis players
Associação Atlética Coruripe players
Sociedade Esportiva do Gama players
Botafogo de Futebol e Regatas players
Avaí FC players
Esporte Clube Vitória players
Red Bull Brasil players
Daegu FC players
Oeste Futebol Clube players
Associação Atlética Ponte Preta players
América Futebol Clube (RN) players
Central Sport Club players
União Recreativa dos Trabalhadores players
J2 League players
K League 1 players
Expatriate footballers in Japan
Expatriate footballers in South Korea
Brazilian expatriate sportspeople in South Korea
Association football forwards
People from Maceió
Sportspeople from Alagoas